Liechtenstein competed at the 2019 World Aquatics Championships in Gwangju, South Korea from 12 to 28 July.

Artistic swimming

Liechtenstein's artistic swimming team consisted of 2 athletes (2 female).

Women

Swimming

Liechtenstein entered two swimmers.

Men

Women

References

Nations at the 2019 World Aquatics Championships
Liechtenstein at the World Aquatics Championships
2019 in Liechtenstein sport